Luzerne is a city in Benton County, Iowa, United States. The population was 112 at the time of the 2020 census. It is part of the Cedar Rapids Metropolitan Statistical Area.

History
Luzerne was founded following construction of the Chicago and Northwestern Railway through the territory. Luzerne was platted as a town on the railroad in 1868. It was named after the city of Lucerne, in Switzerland.

Geography

Demographics

2010 census
As of the census of 2010, there were 96 people, 34 households, and 26 families living in the city. The racial makeup of the city was 91.7% White, 2.1% African American, 4.2% from other races, and 2.1% from two or more races. Hispanic or Latino of any race were 5.2% of the population.

There were 34 households, of which 47.1% had children under the age of 18 living with them, 47.1% were married couples living together, 20.6% had a female householder with no husband present, 8.8% had a male householder with no wife present, and 23.5% were non-families. 20.6% of all households were made up of individuals, and 8.8% had someone living alone who was 65 years of age or older. The average household size was 2.82 and the average family size was 3.08.

The median age in the city was 28.5 years. 32.3% of residents were under the age of 18; 9.5% were between the ages of 18 and 24; 25% were from 25 to 44; 25% were from 45 to 64; and 8.3% were 65 years of age or older. The gender makeup of the city was 53.1% male and 46.9% female.

2000 census
As of the census of 2000, there were 105 people, 37 households, and 31 families living in the city. The racial makeup of the city was 100.00% White.

There were 37 households, out of which 54.1% had children under the age of 18 living with them, 70.3% were married couples living together, 5.4% had a female householder with no husband present, and 16.2% were non-families. 13.5% of all households were made up of individuals, and 5.4% had someone living alone who was 65 years of age or older. The average household size was 2.84 and the average family size was 3.06.

In the city, the population was spread out, with 33.3% under the age of 18, 4.8% from 18 to 24, 31.4% from 25 to 44, 14.3% from 45 to 64, and 16.2% who were 65 years of age or older. The median age was 36 years. For every 100 females, there were 105.9 males. For every 100 females age 18 and over, there were 94.4 males.

The median income for a household in the city was $28,750, and the median income for a family was $34,688. Males had a median income of $30,833 versus $28,333 for females. The per capita income for the city was $14,747. None of the population and none of the families were below the poverty line.

References

Cities in Benton County, Iowa
Cities in Iowa
Cedar Rapids, Iowa metropolitan area
1868 establishments in Iowa
Populated places established in 1868